Annabel Nanninga (born 6 November 1977 in Amsterdam) is a Dutch politician and journalist who was the co-founder of the JA21 party. She currently leads the party in the Senate and is a representative of the Provincial Council of North Holland. She has been a member of Amsterdam city council since 2018.

Early life and career
Nanninga was born in the Amsterdam neighbourhood 'Dapperbuurt'. Also in Amsterdam, she attended the prestigious Barlaeus Gymnasium (high school). In an interview with RTL Nederland, she stated that she sometimes skipped classes to self-educate in the public library at the Prinsengracht. Nanninga subsequently dropped out of school as a teenager and held various jobs including in an ice cream parlor, as a caterer and in a fashion store.

In 2012, she took an interest in blogging and journalism and began submitting op-eds to GeenStijl, PowNed, and Veronica Magazine among others. In 2014, she co-founded the Dutch online news platform Jalta.nl with Joshua Livestro and was the site's managing editor until 2015. The website hired notable figures such as Frits Bolkestein, Thierry Baudet and Hafid Bouazza to write columns. She was also a columnist for DeJaap magazine.

Political career
In the 2018 Dutch municipal elections, she was the party leader for Forum for Democracy (FVD) in Amsterdam. FVD received three seats in the municipal council. Nanninga was sworn in as a councilor on March 29, 2018. In March 2019 she also became a member of the Provincial Council of North Holland. In the same elections, she was elected in the Provincial Council of Utrecht with preferential votes. In October 2020 Nanninga went on maternity leave and was temporarily replaced by Hugo Berkhout and later by Robert Baljeu in the Senate.

In November 2020, she left the FvD, when this party, in her opinion, did not distance itself fiercely enough from antisemitic apps written by members of its youth division. Together with former FvD candidate Joost Eerdmans she founded the party JA21 On February 15, 2021, she returned to the Senate from her leave and joined the Van Pareren faction, which was renamed the Nanninga faction and has 7 seats. The faction subsequently became part of JA21.

Controversies 
Nanninga posted a series of tweets on her Twitter page in 2006, which by some people were deemed antisemitic. According to others, her tweets were shown out of context and twisted in order to discredit her. These tweets were retroactively deleted during 2020–21, however multiple internet archives contain screenshots of the tweets. In subsequent interviews, Nanninga stated that the tweets were intended to be satirical and had to be considered in their specific context, on which she extensively elaborated in Nieuw Israëlietisch Weekblad. Nanninga also encountered some controversy over columns, in which she criticised the influx of migrants during the European refugee crisis and made satirical remarks regarding migrants from Africa trying to cross the Mediterranean Sea. Nanninga later claimed she used the ironic writing style of Gerard Reve. In 2015, at the height of the refugee crisis, she sheltered a homosexual asylumseeker in her house for six months, because he was harassed at the asylum center.

Electoral history

Personal life 
Nanninga has three children: her first daughter was born when she was 19 years old; her second daughter followed three years later. In 2020 she had a son.

References 

Living people
1977 births
Members of the Senate (Netherlands)
JA21 politicians
21st-century Dutch politicians
21st-century Dutch women politicians
Dutch journalists